Larry J. Young is the William P. Timmie Professor of Psychiatry and Behavioral Sciences at the School of Medicine at Emory University. Dr. Young studies how genetic, cellular and neurobiological mechanisms regulate complex social behavior, including social cognition and social bonding. His research focuses heavily on the roles of the neuropeptides oxytocin and vasopressin in regulating the neural processing of social signals and social attachment.
 
Dr. Young has developed behavioral paradigms that are useful for screening drugs that enhance social cognition, and the development of novel strategies for drug discovery in the treatment of psychiatric disorders. Dr. Young is also the director of the Center for Translational Social Neuroscience (CTSN) at Emory University, which brings together scientists and clinicians in the Atlanta area who are focused on understanding and healing the human brain. Dr. Young's work has also been the subject of a National Geographic documentary.

Early life

Dr. Young grew up on a farm in a rural part of Georgia. Life in a rural town made it difficult of for him to access educational materials, so he spent most of his time observing the natural world. This experience formed his interest in the biological sciences. As an undergraduate, Dr. Young majored in Biochemistry, graduating from the University of Georgia in 1989. He went on to pursue his Ph.D at the University of Texas at Austin, graduating in 1994 with a degree in Neuroendocrinology. He completed his post-doc studies at Emory University, focusing his research on the role and influence of genes in social expression.

Scientific work with Prairie Voles

While at Emory University, Dr. Young conducted experiments on prairie voles, to demonstrate the role that genes play in forming social bonds. Prairie voles were selected since different species have different mating strategies. Certain species of prairie voles are monogamous, an evolutionary response to environmental factors (i.e, predation, food scarcity, rearing of young). While other species of prairie voles are promiscuous, a response to a lack of evolutionary and environmental stressors. To test if these evolutionary factors were responsible for the divergence of mating strategies among prairie voles, Dr. Young altered one single gene in the promiscuous species of a prairie vole. The genetic alteration changed the mating behaviour of the prairie vole, turning a once promiscuous prairie vole, monogamous. The change in mating behaviour, while genetic in nature, was caused by an increase in the receptiveness of the prairie voles brain to the neuropeptides oxytocin and vasopressin. The results of the study generated great interest beyond the scientific community, with stories appearing in NPR   and with National Geographic making a documentary on Dr. Young's work.

Publications 
The Chemistry Between Us: Love, Sex, and the Science of Attraction with Brian Alexander (2012) 
Neurobiological mechanisms of social attachment and pair bonding (2015) 
The prairie vole: an emerging model organism for understanding the social brain (2010) 
The neuroendocrinology of the social brain (2009) 
Being human: love: neuroscience reveals all (2009) 
Vasopressin and pair-bond formation: genes to brain to behavior (2006) 
Anatomy and neurochemistry of the pair bond (2005) 
The role of vasopressin in the genetic and neural regulation of monogamy (2004) 
The neurobiology of social recognition, approach, and avoidance (2002) 
Neuroendocrine bases of monogamy (1998) 

A full archive of Dr. Young's work can be found at PubMed  and also on Google Scholar  with each maintaining a repository of over 164 scientific articles.

References

Year of birth missing (living people)
Living people
Emory University faculty
American psychiatrists